Pusat Bandar Damansara is a township in the Segambut constituency of Kuala Lumpur, Malaysia. The original buildings making up the township were constructed between 1981 and 1984, and were demolished in 2016 for new development.

Background

Offices in the original buildings of Damansara Town Centre were occupied by government ministries, departments and other private corporations such as Damansara Realty Berhad, Indah Water Konsortium, HELP University College and Johor Corporation (J-Corp). Department of Immigration Malaysia and Ministry of Housing, and Local Governments Malaysia used to have their offices here and have since moved to Putrajaya, while passport renewal services were relocated to Pudu Sentral several years ago. Restaurants, convenience stores, supermarkets were located on the ground floor.

During the upgrading of Jalan Damansara into  Sprint Expressway's Damansara Link in 2000, the town centre became an "island" between separate carriageways. In 2011 the Twins@Damansara Heights condominium block opened, the first of many high rise buildings to come. In 2014 it was announced that the original buildings of Damansara Town Centre will be demolished and redeveloped as office buildings, apartments, a hotel and 'Pavilion Damansara Heights', the sister of the Pavilion Mall in Bukit Bintang in downtown Kuala Lumpur.

Access

Public transport
Damansara Town Centre lends its name to, and is served by, the  Pusat Bandar Damansara and  Semantan MRT stations. These stations once served as the only connection between the Kajang MRT Line and KL Sentral by rapidKL bus T819, while waiting for opening of the Semantan-Kajang stretch in July 2017.

Besides the aforementioned T819 route, the MRT station also serves as a bus hub for rapidKL buses connecting Damansara Town Centre to Segambut/Sri Hartamas, Mid Valley Megamall and the Ampang and Sri Petaling Lines'  Bandaraya station.

List of roads
 Jalan Damanlela
 Jalan Damansutera
 Jalan Damansari
 Jalan Damansuria

References

Suburbs in Kuala Lumpur
Demolished buildings and structures in Malaysia
Buildings and structures demolished in 2016